The 4th Cruiser Squadron  and (also known as Cruiser Force H)  was a formation of cruisers of the British Royal Navy from 1907 to 1914 and then again from 1919 to 1946.

The squadron was first established in 1907, replacing the North America and West Indies Station. It became a training squadron based in Home waters but which was to make three cruises annually, including to the West Indies.

On 1 May 1912, the Fourth Cruiser Squadron was renamed the Training Squadron. With the appointment in 1913 of Rear Admiral Christopher Cradock the squadron ceased to be a training squadron and became part of the First Fleet. During World War I, the 4th Cruiser Squadron was commanded by Rear Admiral Christopher Cradock; the squadron was effectively annihilated at the Battle of Coronel 1 November 1914.

Ships on 1 November 1914

Notes

References 
  Friedman, Norman (2012). British Cruisers of the Victorian Era. Barnsley: Seaforth Publishing. .
 
 
 

Cruiser squadrons of the Royal Navy
Military units and formations of the Royal Navy in World War II